The following is an alphabetical listing of the 489 species in the genus Elaeocarpus that are accepted by Plants of the World Online . The Australian Plant Census additionally accepts E. michaelii.

A

 Elaeocarpus achmadii 
 Elaeocarpus acmocarpus 
 Elaeocarpus acmosepalus 
 Elaeocarpus acrantherus 
 Elaeocarpus acronodia 
 Elaeocarpus acuminatus 
 Elaeocarpus adenopus 
 Elaeocarpus affinis 
 Elaeocarpus alanganorum 
 Elaeocarpus alaternoides 
 Elaeocarpus albiflorus 
 Elaeocarpus alnifolius 
 Elaeocarpus altigenus 
 Elaeocarpus altisectus 
 Elaeocarpus amabilis 
 Elaeocarpus amboinensis 
 Elaeocarpus amoenus 
 Elaeocarpus ampliflorus 
 Elaeocarpus amplifolius 
 Elaeocarpus angustifolius 
 Elaeocarpus angustipes 
 Elaeocarpus apoensis 
 Elaeocarpus arfakensis 
 Elaeocarpus argenteus 
 Elaeocarpus aristatus 
 Elaeocarpus arnhemicus 
 Elaeocarpus atropunctatus 
 Elaeocarpus auricomus 
 Elaeocarpus austroyunnanensis 
 Elaeocarpus avium 
 Elaeocarpus azaleifolius

B

 Elaeocarpus bachmaensis 
 Elaeocarpus badius 
 Elaeocarpus bakaianus 
 Elaeocarpus balabanii 
 Elaeocarpus balansae 
 Elaeocarpus balgooyi 
 Elaeocarpus bancroftii 
 Elaeocarpus baramii 
 Elaeocarpus barbulatus 
 Elaeocarpus bataanensis 
 Elaeocarpus batjanicus 
 Elaeocarpus batudulangii 
 Elaeocarpus batui 
 Elaeocarpus baudouinii 
 Elaeocarpus beccarii 
 Elaeocarpus bellus 
 Elaeocarpus bidupensis 
 Elaeocarpus bifidus 
 Elaeocarpus biflorus 
 Elaeocarpus bilobatus 
 Elaeocarpus bilongvinas 
 Elaeocarpus blascoi 
 Elaeocarpus blepharoceras 
 Elaeocarpus bojeri 
 Elaeocarpus bokorensis 
 Elaeocarpus bonii 
 Elaeocarpus bontocensis 
 Elaeocarpus braceanus 
 Elaeocarpus brachypodus 
 Elaeocarpus brachystachyus 
 Elaeocarpus bracteatus 
 Elaeocarpus branderhorstii 
 Elaeocarpus brigittae 
 Elaeocarpus brunneotomentosus 
 Elaeocarpus brunnescens 
 Elaeocarpus buderi 
 Elaeocarpus bullatus 
 Elaeocarpus burebidensis 
 Elaeocarpus burkii

C

 Elaeocarpus calomala 
 Elaeocarpus candollei 
 Elaeocarpus capuronii 
 Elaeocarpus carbinensis 
 Elaeocarpus carolinae 
 Elaeocarpus carolinensis 
 Elaeocarpus cassinoides 
 Elaeocarpus castaneifolius 
 Elaeocarpus celebesianus 
 Elaeocarpus celebicus 
 Elaeocarpus ceylanicus 
 Elaeocarpus cheirophorus 
 Elaeocarpus chelonimorphus 
 Elaeocarpus chewii 
 Elaeocarpus chinensis 
 Elaeocarpus chionanthus 
 Elaeocarpus christophersenii 
 Elaeocarpus chrysophyllus 
 Elaeocarpus clementis 
 Elaeocarpus clethroides 
 Elaeocarpus coactilus 
 Elaeocarpus colnettianus 
 Elaeocarpus coloides 
 Elaeocarpus compactus 
 Elaeocarpus comptonii 
 Elaeocarpus conoideus 
 Elaeocarpus coodei 
 Elaeocarpus coorangooloo 
 Elaeocarpus corallococcus 
 Elaeocarpus cordifolius 
 Elaeocarpus coriaceus 
 Elaeocarpus corneri 
 Elaeocarpus corsonianus 
 Elaeocarpus costatus 
 Elaeocarpus coumbouiensis 
 Elaeocarpus crassinervatus 
 Elaeocarpus crassus 
 Elaeocarpus crenulatus 
 Elaeocarpus cristatus 
 Elaeocarpus cruciatus 
 Elaeocarpus cuernosensis 
 Elaeocarpus culminicola 
 Elaeocarpus cumingii 
 Elaeocarpus cupreus 
 Elaeocarpus curranii

D

 Elaeocarpus dallmannensis 
 Elaeocarpus darlacensis 
 Elaeocarpus dasycarpus 
 Elaeocarpus davisii 
 Elaeocarpus debruynii 
 Elaeocarpus decandrus 
 Elaeocarpus decipiens 
 Elaeocarpus degenerianus 
 Elaeocarpus densiflorus 
 Elaeocarpus dentatus 
 Elaeocarpus dewildei 
 Elaeocarpus dianxiensis 
 Elaeocarpus dictyophlebius 
 Elaeocarpus dinagatensis 
 Elaeocarpus divaricativenus 
 Elaeocarpus dognyensis 
 Elaeocarpus dolichobotrys 
 Elaeocarpus dolichodactylus 
 Elaeocarpus dolichostylus 
 Elaeocarpus dubius 
 Elaeocarpus duclouxii

E

 Elaeocarpus elaeagnoides 
 Elaeocarpus elatus 
 Elaeocarpus elliffii 
 Elaeocarpus elmeri 
 Elaeocarpus erdinii 
 Elaeocarpus eriobotryoides 
 Elaeocarpus eumundi 
 Elaeocarpus euneurus 
 Elaeocarpus eymae

F

 Elaeocarpus fairchildii 
 Elaeocarpus ferrugineus 
 Elaeocarpus ferruginiflorus 
 Elaeocarpus filiformidentatus 
 Elaeocarpus finisterrae 
 Elaeocarpus firdausii 
 Elaeocarpus firmus 
 Elaeocarpus flavescens 
 Elaeocarpus fleuryi 
 Elaeocarpus floresii 
 Elaeocarpus floribundus 
 Elaeocarpus floridanus 
 Elaeocarpus forbesii 
 Elaeocarpus foveolatus 
 Elaeocarpus foxworthyi 
 Elaeocarpus fraseri 
 Elaeocarpus fruticosus 
 Elaeocarpus fulgens 
 Elaeocarpus fulvus 
 Elaeocarpus fuscoides 
 Elaeocarpus fuscus

G

 Elaeocarpus gagnepainii 
 Elaeocarpus gambutanus 
 Elaeocarpus gammillii 
 Elaeocarpus gaoligongshanensis 
 Elaeocarpus gardneri 
 Elaeocarpus gaussenii 
 Elaeocarpus geminiflorus 
 Elaeocarpus gigantifolius 
 Elaeocarpus gillespieanus 
 Elaeocarpus gitingensis 
 Elaeocarpus glaber 
 Elaeocarpus glaberrimus 
 Elaeocarpus glabripetalus 
 Elaeocarpus glandulifer 
 Elaeocarpus glandulosus 
 Elaeocarpus gordonii 
 Elaeocarpus graeffei 
 Elaeocarpus grahamii 
 Elaeocarpus grandiflorus 
 Elaeocarpus grandifolius 
 Elaeocarpus grandis 
 Elaeocarpus griffithii 
 Elaeocarpus griseopuberulus 
 Elaeocarpus grumosus 
 Elaeocarpus guillaumii 
 Elaeocarpus gummatus 
 Elaeocarpus gustaviifolius 
 Elaeocarpus gymnogynus

H

 Elaeocarpus habbemensis 
 Elaeocarpus hainanensis 
 Elaeocarpus halconensis 
 Elaeocarpus hallieri 
 Elaeocarpus harmandii 
 Elaeocarpus hartleyi 
 Elaeocarpus harunii 
 Elaeocarpus hayatae 
 Elaeocarpus hebecarpus 
 Elaeocarpus hedyosmus 
 Elaeocarpus heptadactyloides 
 Elaeocarpus hildebrandtii 
 Elaeocarpus hochreutineri 
 Elaeocarpus holopetalus 
 Elaeocarpus homalioides 
 Elaeocarpus hookerianus 
 Elaeocarpus hortensis 
 Elaeocarpus howii 
 Elaeocarpus hygrophilus 
 Elaeocarpus hylobroma 
 Elaeocarpus hypadenus

I

 Elaeocarpus ilocanus 
 Elaeocarpus indochinensis 
 Elaeocarpus inopinatus 
 Elaeocarpus inopportunus 
 Elaeocarpus insignis 
 Elaeocarpus integrifolius 
 Elaeocarpus integripetalus 
 Elaeocarpus isotrichus

J

 Elaeocarpus jacobsii 
 Elaeocarpus japonicus 
 Elaeocarpus joga 
 Elaeocarpus johnsii 
 Elaeocarpus johnsonii 
 Elaeocarpus jugahanus

K

 Elaeocarpus kaalensis 
 Elaeocarpus kajewskii 
 Elaeocarpus kalabitii 
 Elaeocarpus kambi 
 Elaeocarpus kaniensis 
 Elaeocarpus kasiensis 
 Elaeocarpus kerstingianus 
 Elaeocarpus kinabaluensis 
 Elaeocarpus kirtonii 
 Elaeocarpus kjellbergii 
 Elaeocarpus knuthii 
 Elaeocarpus kontumensis 
 Elaeocarpus kostermansii 
 Elaeocarpus kraengensis 
 Elaeocarpus kunstleri 
 Elaeocarpus kusaiensis 
 Elaeocarpus kusanoi

L

 Elaeocarpus lacunosus 
 Elaeocarpus lagunensis 
 Elaeocarpus lanceifolius 
 Elaeocarpus lancipetalus 
 Elaeocarpus lancistipulatus 
 Elaeocarpus lanipae 
 Elaeocarpus laoticus 
 Elaeocarpus largiflorens 
 Elaeocarpus latescens 
 Elaeocarpus laurifolius 
 Elaeocarpus lawasii 
 Elaeocarpus laxirameus 
 Elaeocarpus ledermannii 
 Elaeocarpus leopoldii 
 Elaeocarpus lepidus 
 Elaeocarpus leratii 
 Elaeocarpus leucanthus 
 Elaeocarpus leytensis 
 Elaeocarpus limitaneoides 
 Elaeocarpus limitaneus 
 Elaeocarpus linearifolius 
 Elaeocarpus lingualis 
 Elaeocarpus linnaei 
 Elaeocarpus linsmithii 
 Elaeocarpus longifolius 
 Elaeocarpus longlingensis 
 Elaeocarpus lucidus 
 Elaeocarpus luteolignum 
 Elaeocarpus luteolus 
 Elaeocarpus luzonicus

M

 Elaeocarpus macdonaldii 
 Elaeocarpus macranthus 
 Elaeocarpus macrocarpus 
 Elaeocarpus macrocerus 
 Elaeocarpus macrophyllus 
 Elaeocarpus macropus 
 Elaeocarpus magnifolius 
 Elaeocarpus mallotoides 
 Elaeocarpus mamasii 
 Elaeocarpus mandiae 
 Elaeocarpus marafunganus 
 Elaeocarpus marginatus 
 Elaeocarpus mastersii 
 Elaeocarpus medioglaber 
 Elaeocarpus megacarpus 
 Elaeocarpus melochioides 
 Elaeocarpus merrittii 
 Elaeocarpus micranthus 
 Elaeocarpus miegei 
 Elaeocarpus millarii 
 Elaeocarpus milnei 
 Elaeocarpus mindanaensis 
 Elaeocarpus mindoroensis 
 Elaeocarpus mingendensis 
 Elaeocarpus miquelii 
 Elaeocarpus miriensis 
 Elaeocarpus mollis 
 Elaeocarpus monocera 
 Elaeocarpus montanus 
 Elaeocarpus moratii 
 Elaeocarpus multiflorus 
 Elaeocarpus multinervosus 
 Elaeocarpus multisectus 
 Elaeocarpus muluensis 
 Elaeocarpus munroi 
 Elaeocarpus murudensis 
 Elaeocarpus murukkai 
 Elaeocarpus musseri 
 Elaeocarpus mutabilis 
 Elaeocarpus myrmecophilus 
 Elaeocarpus myrtoides

N

 Elaeocarpus nanus 
 Elaeocarpus neobritannicus 
 Elaeocarpus nervosus 
 Elaeocarpus ngii 
 Elaeocarpus nitentifolius 
 Elaeocarpus nitidulus 
 Elaeocarpus nitidus 
 Elaeocarpus nodosus 
 Elaeocarpus nooteboomii 
 Elaeocarpus nouhuysii 
 Elaeocarpus nubigenus

O

 Elaeocarpus oblongilimbus 
 Elaeocarpus obovatus 
 Elaeocarpus obtusus 
 Elaeocarpus occidentalis 
 Elaeocarpus octantherus 
 Elaeocarpus octopetalus 
 Elaeocarpus oriomensis 
 Elaeocarpus ornatus 
 Elaeocarpus orohensis 
 Elaeocarpus osiae 
 Elaeocarpus ovalis 
 Elaeocarpus oviger

P

 Elaeocarpus pachyanthus 
 Elaeocarpus pachydactylus 
 Elaeocarpus pachyophrys 
 Elaeocarpus pagonensis 
 Elaeocarpus palembanicus 
 Elaeocarpus parviflorus 
 Elaeocarpus parvilimbus 
 Elaeocarpus pedunculatus 
 Elaeocarpus pentadactylus 
 Elaeocarpus perrieri 
 Elaeocarpus persicifolius 
 Elaeocarpus petelotii 
 Elaeocarpus petiolatus 
 Elaeocarpus philippinensis 
 Elaeocarpus photiniifolius 
 Elaeocarpus pierrei 
 Elaeocarpus piestocarpus 
 Elaeocarpus pinosukii 
 Elaeocarpus pittosporoides 
 Elaeocarpus poculifer 
 Elaeocarpus poilanei 
 Elaeocarpus polyandrus 
 Elaeocarpus polyanthus 
 Elaeocarpus polycarpus 
 Elaeocarpus polydactylus 
 Elaeocarpus polystachyus 
 Elaeocarpus praeclarus 
 Elaeocarpus prafiensis 
 Elaeocarpus prunifolioides 
 Elaeocarpus prunifolius 
 Elaeocarpus pseudopaniculatus 
 Elaeocarpus ptilanthus 
 Elaeocarpus pulchellus 
 Elaeocarpus pullenii 
 Elaeocarpus punctatus 
 Elaeocarpus purus 
 Elaeocarpus pycnanthus 
 Elaeocarpus pyriformis

Q

 Elaeocarpus quadratus

R

 Elaeocarpus ramiflorus 
 Elaeocarpus recurvatus 
 Elaeocarpus renae 
 Elaeocarpus retakensis 
 Elaeocarpus reticosus 
 Elaeocarpus reticulatus 
 Elaeocarpus rivularis 
 Elaeocarpus robustus 
 Elaeocarpus roseiflorus 
 Elaeocarpus roseoalbus 
 Elaeocarpus roslii 
 Elaeocarpus rosselensis 
 Elaeocarpus rotundifolius 
 Elaeocarpus royenii 
 Elaeocarpus rubescens 
 Elaeocarpus rubidus 
 Elaeocarpus rufovestitus 
 Elaeocarpus rugosus 
 Elaeocarpus ruminatus 
 Elaeocarpus rumphii 
 Elaeocarpus rutengii

S

 Elaeocarpus sadikanensis 
 Elaeocarpus salicifolius 
 Elaeocarpus sallehianus 
 Elaeocarpus samari 
 Elaeocarpus sarcanthus 
 Elaeocarpus sayeri 
 Elaeocarpus schlechterianus 
 Elaeocarpus schmutzii 
 Elaeocarpus schoddei 
 Elaeocarpus sebastianii 
 Elaeocarpus sedentarius 
 Elaeocarpus sepikanus 
 Elaeocarpus seramicus 
 Elaeocarpus sericoloides 
 Elaeocarpus sericopetalus 
 Elaeocarpus seringii 
 Elaeocarpus serratus 
 Elaeocarpus sikkimensis 
 Elaeocarpus simaluensis 
 Elaeocarpus simplex 
 Elaeocarpus spathulatus 
 Elaeocarpus speciosus 
 Elaeocarpus sphaerocarpus 
 Elaeocarpus stapfianus 
 Elaeocarpus stellaris 
 Elaeocarpus sterrophyilus 
 Elaeocarpus steupii 
 Elaeocarpus stipularis 
 Elaeocarpus storckii 
 Elaeocarpus subcapitatus 
 Elaeocarpus subisensis 
 Elaeocarpus sublucidus 
 Elaeocarpus submonoceras 
 Elaeocarpus subpetiolatus 
 Elaeocarpus subpuberus 
 Elaeocarpus subserratus 
 Elaeocarpus subvillosus 
 Elaeocarpus surigaensis 
 Elaeocarpus sylvestris 
 Elaeocarpus symingtonii

T

 Elaeocarpus tahanensis 
 Elaeocarpus takolensis 
 Elaeocarpus taprobanicus 
 Elaeocarpus tariensis 
 Elaeocarpus tectonifolius 
 Elaeocarpus tectorius 
 Elaeocarpus terminalioides 
 Elaeocarpus teysmannii 
 Elaeocarpus thelmae 
 Elaeocarpus thorelii 
 Elaeocarpus timikensis 
 Elaeocarpus timorensis 
 Elaeocarpus tjerengii 
 Elaeocarpus tonganus 
 Elaeocarpus toninensis 
 Elaeocarpus tonkinensis 
 Elaeocarpus tremulus 
 Elaeocarpus treubii 
 Elaeocarpus trichopetalus 
 Elaeocarpus trichophyllus 
 Elaeocarpus triflorus 
 Elaeocarpus truncatus 
 Elaeocarpus tuasivicus 
 Elaeocarpus tuberculatus

U

Elaeocarpus ulianus 
Elaeocarpus undulatus 
Elaeocarpus urophyllus

V

 Elaeocarpus vaccinioides 
 Elaeocarpus valetonii 
 Elaeocarpus validus 
 Elaeocarpus variabilis 
 Elaeocarpus varunua 
 Elaeocarpus venosus 
 Elaeocarpus venustus 
 Elaeocarpus verheijenii 
 Elaeocarpus verruculosus 
 Elaeocarpus versicolor 
 Elaeocarpus verticillatus 
 Elaeocarpus vieillardii 
 Elaeocarpus viguieri 
 Elaeocarpus vitiensis

W

 Elaeocarpus weibelianus 
 Elaeocarpus whartonensis 
 Elaeocarpus williamsianus 
 Elaeocarpus womersleyi 
 Elaeocarpus wrayi

X

 Elaeocarpus xanthodactylus

Y

 Elaeocarpus yateensis

Z

 Elaeocarpus zambalensis

References

External links

Elaeocarpus
Elaeocarpus